Liz Magor (born 1948) is a Canadian visual artist based in Vancouver. She is well known for her sculptures that address themes of history, shelter and survival through objects that reference still life, domesticity and wildlife. She often re-purposes domestic objects such as blankets and is known for using mold making techniques.

Biography
Magor was born in Winnipeg, Manitoba in 1948. Magor studied at the University of British Columbia from 1966-1968, and Parsons School of Design in New York from 1968-1970. Subsequently, she completed her diploma at the Vancouver School of Art in 1971. She had a career as a respected educator at the Ontario College of Art and Design before moving to Vancouver to continue her teaching at the Emily Carr University of Art and Design where she continued to be major influence on a younger generation of artists. Alongside Stan Douglas, Brian Jungen, and Jeff Wall, Magor's work and studio practice was featured in the Vancouver episode of season 8 of the PBS broadcast Art21: Art in the Twenty-First Century.

Magor's internationally exhibited and produced work usually takes the form of sculpture, installation, or photography. Major solo exhibitions of her work have been presented internationally at The Renaissance Society, Chicago; Carpenter Center for the Visual Arts, Cambridge; The Modern and Contemporary Art Museum of Nice; Kunstverein in Hamburg; Migros Museum of Contemporary Art, Zurich, among other venues. In Canada she has exhibited widely at prominent institutions such as the Musée d’art contemporain de Montréal, the Art Gallery of Ontario, the Vancouver Art Gallery, the Winnipeg Art Gallery, and the National Gallery of Canada. Alongside Ian Carr-Harris, she represented Canada at the XLI Biennale of Venice, Italy, in 1984, and she was invited to participate at documenta 8 in Kassel, in 1987.

Magor has been recognized with civic, national, and international awards. In 2001, awarded the Governor General's Award in Visual and Media Arts. In Vancouver, she was recognized with the sixth annual Audain Prize for Lifetime Achievement in the Visual Arts in 2009. In 2014, she was the recipient of the Gershon Iskowitz Prize, awarded by the Art Gallery of Ontario with a solo exhibition. In 2019, she was named Chevalier de l’Ordre des Arts et des Lettres by the government of France.

Art Practice

Liz Magor works in sculpture, installation, public art and photography. Her sculptural work investigates the ontology of ordinary or familiar objects, which she remakes and presents in new contexts. For example, Magor has created facsimiles of food items and their containers, as well as other objects such as driftwood, logs, tree stumps, and clothing.  A studio- and object-oriented artist, Magor’s work emphasizes process and materiality, and highlights the difference between the real and the simulated.

In previous work, Magor used mold-making and casting techniques to make replicas of coats, trays and cutlery (which she calls "serviceable objects") as receptacles for other materials (such as candies or cigarettes). These works reference the accumulation of discarded goods and vices that appeal to our common impulses. They also raise questions about the social and emotional life of objects. Magor’s more recent work involves the repurposing of used clothing and old wool blankets (other types of "serviceable objects").

In her article entitled Magor's Timeless Transitions, Robin Laurence writes, "Art, Liz Magor says, is the place where our perceptions are opened and examined for prolonged periods of time. Much longer, she suggests, than in our day-to-day encounters with the visual world, where we tend to interpret given signs in fixed ways, and where our first impressions are usually consolidated by our second [impressions]. Magor's art refutes such consolidation: irresolution prevails and closure eludes us. Her sculptures consistently play reality against unreality, meaning against alternative meaning, initial appearance against later revelation."

Magor's permanent or temporary public works have been installed in Vancouver  and the Greater Vancouver Regional District, and Toronto and the Toronto area.

Magor is represented by Susan Hobbs Gallery and Catriona Jeffries in Canada, Andrew Kreps Gallery in the United States, and Marcelle Alix in France. In her early career, she was represented by Ydessa Hendeles's The Ydessa Gallery in Toronto.

Collections 
Liz Magor's work is found in public and private collections in Canada and internationally, such as the Vancouver Art Gallery, the Morris and Helen Belkin Art Gallery, at The University of British Columbia, the Winnipeg Art Gallery, the Musée d'art contemporain de Montréal, and the National Gallery of Canada, in Canada; the Henry Art Gallery, in the United States; as well as the collections of Centre national des arts plastiques, Frac Corse, and Frac Île-de-France in France.

Bibliography 
Monographs and exhibition catalogues:
 Byers, Dan; Øvstebo, Solveig; Heti, Sheila; Speed, Mitch (2019). BLOWOUT. Cambridge, MA; Chicago, IL: Carpenter Center for the Arts and The Renaissance Society. .
Adler, Dan; Johnstone, Lesley; Magor, Liz; Munder, Heike; Steinbrügge, Bettina (2016). Habitude. Montreal, QC; Zürich; Hamburg: Musée d’art contemporain de Montréal, Migros Museum für Gegenwartskunst, and Kunstverein in Hamburg. .

Arnold, Grant; and Monk, Philip; et al. Liz Magor. Toronto/Vancouver: The Power Plant/Vancouver Art Gallery, 2002

References

Further reading
Adler, Dan. "Liz Magor: Susan Hobbs Gallery". Artforum, Summer 2007
Campbell, Deborah. "The Outlaw". Canadian Art, Summer 2009, 42-47
Dault, Gary Michael. "Look closer to grasp Molly’s Reach". The Globe and Mail, 12 March 2005
Feinstein, Roni. "Report from Toronto: Opening Doors". Art in America, no.11 (November 1994), 38-47
Gopnik, Blake. "’Flaws’ point to artist’s crucial theme: artificiality". The Globe and Mail, 2 September 2000
Lafo, Rachel Rosenfield. "The Potency of Ordinary Objects: A Conversation with Liz Magor". Sculpture Magazine, November 2012, 36-41
Laurence, Robin. "Material Intelligence: The Art of Liz Magor". Border Crossings, vol.22, no.86 (2003), 36-41
Marshall, Lisa. "Liz Magor". Canadian Art, Spring 2013
Monk, Philip. "Liz Magor, Equinox Gallery". C Magazine, September–November 1999
Nicholas, Vanessa. "Liz Magor: Blanket Statements". Canadian Art.ca, posted 5 May 2011
Tousley, Nancy. "Liz Magor". Canadian Art, 17.1(Spring 2000), 70-74
Woodley, E. C. "Liz Magor". Art in America. 9 October 2011

1948 births
Artists from Winnipeg
Canadian installation artists
Canadian photographers
Canadian sculptors
Canadian women artists
Living people
Canadian contemporary artists
Governor General's Award in Visual and Media Arts winners
University of British Columbia alumni